Back to Babylon is a documentary film directed by the Iraqi-French film director Abbas Fahdel.

Synopsis

Back in his home town of Babylon after a long exile, the Iraqi-born director Abbas Fahdel asks himself:  "What has become of my friends?  What has life here made of them?  What would life here have made of me had I not decided to follow the course of destiny elsewhere?" In his search and inquiries, his encounters with the friends of his youth, it is the situation today in Iraq that is revealed through the camera's eye:  the ravages of Saddam Hussein's dictatorship, the after-effects of the Iran-Iraq war, the Gulf War and the embargo imposed by the United Nations.

See also

Cinema of Iraq
Iraqi culture

References

External links
 
 Official website 
 Back to Babylon at the International Festival of Audiovisual Programs 
 Photos gallery

Iraqi documentary films
Gulf War films
Documentary films about Iraq
2002 films
2002 documentary films
Autobiographical documentary films
Films directed by Abbas Fahdel